The Midnight Flyer is a 1918 American short action drama film directed by George Marshall and starring Hoot Gibson.

Cast
 Hoot Gibson
 Violet Mersereau
 Helen Gibson
 G. Raymond Nye

Reception
Like many American films of the time, The Midnight Flyer was subject to cuts by city and state film censorship boards. For example, the Chicago Board of Censors required a cut, in Reel 2, of the note reading "Danny will be gone Tuesday", three scenes of young women at bar, the intertitle "I've come to kill you", and the shooting scene.

See also
 Hoot Gibson filmography

References

External links

1918 films
1918 drama films
1918 short films
1910s action drama films
American silent short films
American black-and-white films
Films directed by George Marshall
American action drama films
1910s American films
Silent American drama films
Silent action drama films